The Color is the debut studio album by Yellowbirds. Released on February 15, 2011 by Sam Cohen, when Yellowbirds was still Cohen's solo projects. It was well received by the majority of critics, with Ultimate Guitar giving it 7.7/10.

Track listing
"The Rest of My Life"
"Rings In the Trees"
"Beneath the Reach of Light"
"The Color Ii"
"The Honest Ocean"
"The Color"
"Pulaski Bridge"
"Our Good Days Are Gone"
"In Our World"
"Wagner, Max"
"The Reason"

Personnel
Yellowbirds

References

External links
The Color at Allmusic

2011 debut albums
Yellowbirds albums